Rick Brown may refer to:

Richard Shaw Brown (born 1947), American singer and songwriter
Ricky Brown (born 1983), American football player
Ricardo Brown (basketball) (born 1957), also known as Ricky Brown, Filipino American basketball player
Rickey Brown (born 1958), American basketball player
Ricky Brown (basketball) (born 1955), American basketball player
Rick "Grizzly" Brown (1960–2002), American strength athlete and powerlifter
Ricky Brown (tennis) (born 1967), American tennis player
Rick Brown (born 1945), also known as Ricky Fenson, British blues musician

See also
Richard Brown (disambiguation)